Breaking Dawn is a novel by Stephenie Meyer.

Breaking Dawn may also refer to:

Stephenie Meyer
Films and soundtracks based on the Stephenie Meyer novel:
 The Twilight Saga: Breaking Dawn – Part 1, a 2011 film
 The Twilight Saga: Breaking Dawn – Part 1 (soundtrack)
 The Twilight Saga: Breaking Dawn – Part 2, a 2012 film
 The Twilight Saga: Breaking Dawn – Part 2 (soundtrack)

Other
 Breaking Dawn (2004 film), an independent mystery-thriller
 Breaking Dawn (album), a 2021 Japanese-language album by South Korean boy band the Boyz
 Operation Breaking Dawn, a 2022 Israeli military operation